The Kommern Open Air Museum and Rhenish State Museum for Folk Art in Kommern/Eifel is one of the largest open air museums in Europe, covering an area of over 95 hectares and displaying around 67 historic buildings from the Prussian Rhine Province. It is operated by the Rhineland Regional Association (LVR).

History 
The planning for an open-air museum in the Rhineland dates back to the 1950s. Approximately 30 cities, towns and villages between Aachen, Cologne and the Ruhr area, including Duisburg, Krefeld, Rheydt and Kommern (today part of Mechernich, but still independent at that time) applied for the privilege. The selection of Kommern on 28 March 1958 in a run-off election against Krefeld is said to have been thanks to the work of Kommern's Norbert Leduc. The museum was opened on 20 July 1961. Its leaders have been Adelhart Zippelius (to 1981), Dieter Pesch (1981 to 2007) and Josef Mangold (2008 to present).

Museum 
Around 67 buildings, including farmyards, wind mills, workshops, village community buildings like schools, bakehouses, dancing halls and chapels, all of which originated on the territory of the former Prussian Rhine Province and its predecessors, have been gathered together in four groups. Arable fields, vegetable gardens and orchards complete the picture. The exhibits come predominantly from the Westerwald/Middle Rhine region, from the Eifel mountains and Voreifel foothills, from the Lower Rhine and from the Bergisches Land. They portray everyday life from the 15th century. Under construction is another group of buildings, the Rhineland Marketplace, which illustrate the rural and small-town life of the Rhineland, both at home and work, from the 1950s to the 1980s. With that the Kommern Open Air Museum will also become a museum of everyday culture of life in the 20th century.

In addition the museum has permanent and changing exhibitions in its role as the Rhenish State Museum for Folk Culture.

The Kommern Open Air Museum has an annual programme with around 70 special events.

A focal point for the museum is its living history programme. Under the motto  ('History in Action'), actors meet the visitors in the first person as historically identifiable people or as everyday folk from a particular time and social situation and "draw" the museum guests into the past.

Permanent exhibitions 
 ('We Rhinelanders')

In this exhibition the history of the Rhineland and the live of the Rhinelanders is portrayed from the time of the French occupation in 1794 to the start of the economic miracle after 1950. The visitor walks through a historical avenue in an exhibition hall with more than 50 replica buildings from the Rhineland, in which scenarios about Rhenish history are presented.

In addition, there are several changing exhibitions.

Photography ban 
There is a de facto ban on photography in the museum. Private photography is permitted in principle, but any publication of photos and videos, even on non-commercial platforms, is forbidden.

Literature 
 LVR-Freilichtmuseum Kommern. Rheinisches Landesmuseum für Volkskunde. Museum guide, revised by Michael H. Faber.  Auf der Grundlage des vorherigen Museumsführers by Joachim Hähnel, revised by Michael Faber and Manuela Schütze, Cologne, 2000. (= Führer und Schriften des LVR-Freilichtmuseums Kommern - Rheinischen Landesmuseums für Volkskunde No. 62)

Gallery

See also 
 List of European Open Air Museums

References

External links 

 Homepage des Freilichtmuseums Kommern retrieved 3 April 2013
 Ausstellung: Wir Rheinländer
 Ausstellung: Schöne neue Welt – Rheinländer erobern Amerika

Open-air museums in Germany
Museums in North Rhine-Westphalia
Museums in the Eifel
Buildings and structures in Euskirchen (district)
Farm museums in Germany